Hospital Pirovano is a hospital in Buenos Aires, Argentina.

References

Hospitals in Buenos Aires
Hospitals established in 1896